Klaus Ihlenfeld (born 1934) is a German-born artist resident in the United States.

Life 
A native of Berlin, he studied at the Academy of Fine Arts, Berlin, in 1950.  He studied with Hans Uhlmann.

In 1957, he showed at the North Carolina Museum of Art.
He immigrated to Barto, Pennsylvania, and was a studio assistant to Harry Bertoia, and Bertoia's style informs much of his own work.

He is best known for his abstract works in bronze, although he has also produced paintings and graphic art. One of his pieces is in the collection of the Hirshhorn Museum and Sculpture Garden.

References

External links 
Official website
Ihlenfeld at Askart.com

1934 births
Living people
German sculptors
German male sculptors
20th-century American sculptors
21st-century American sculptors